The Mentawai Archipelago rat (Rattus lugens) is a species of rodent in the family Muridae.
It is found only in the Mentawai Islands of Indonesia, on the islands of Siberut, Sipora, Pagai Utara (North Pagai island), and Pagai Selatan (South Pagai island).

References

 Baillie, J. 1996.  Rattus lugens.   2006 IUCN Red List of Threatened Species.   Downloaded on 19 July 2007.

Rattus
Rats of Asia
Endemic fauna of Indonesia
Mentawai Islands Regency
Rodents of Indonesia
Vulnerable fauna of Asia
Mammals described in 1903
Taxonomy articles created by Polbot